Low-background steel, also known as pre-war steel, is any steel produced prior to the detonation of the first nuclear bombs in the 1940s and 1950s. Typically sourced from shipwrecks and other steel artifacts of this era, it is often used for modern particle detectors because more modern steel is contaminated with traces of nuclear fallout.

Since the cessation of atmospheric nuclear testing, background radiation has decreased to very near natural levels, making special low-background steel no longer necessary for most radiation-sensitive applications, as brand-new steel now has a low enough radioactive signature that it can generally be used in such applications. However, some demand remains for the most radiation-sensitive applications, such as Geiger counters and sensing equipment aboard spacecraft, and World War II-era shipwrecks near in the Java Sea and western South China Sea are often illegally scavenged for low-background steel.

Radionuclide contamination

From 1856 until the mid 20th century, steel was produced in the Bessemer process, where air was forced into Bessemer converters converting the pig iron into steel. By the mid-20th century, many steelworks had switched to the BOS process, which uses pure oxygen instead of air. However, as both processes use atmospheric gas, they are susceptible to contamination from airborne particulates. Present-day air carries radionuclides, such as cobalt-60, which are deposited into the steel, giving it a weak radioactive signature.

World anthropogenic background radiation levels peaked at 0.11 mSv/yr above natural levels in 1963, the year that the Partial Nuclear Test Ban Treaty was enacted. Since then, anthropogenic background radiation has decreased to 0.005 mSv/yr above natural levels.

References

Steels
Background radiation